Tom Okker and Marty Riessen won in the final 6–2, 7–6, against Ismail El Shafei and Brian Fairlie.

Seeds
Seeds unavailable.

Draw

Draw

References

External links
 Draw

Doubles